Tiago Nuno Amaral Da Silva Lemos or Tiago Lemos is a Portuguese footballer.

Tiago Lemos was born on 26 September 1977 in Lisbon. He started his career in 1994 when he joined G.D. Estoril-Praia from the youth academy.

External links
 * zerozero.pt

1977 births
Living people
Portuguese footballers
Portuguese expatriate footballers
Association football midfielders
C.F. Estrela da Amadora players
Nea Salamis Famagusta FC players
Cypriot First Division players
Expatriate footballers in Cyprus
Portuguese expatriate sportspeople in Cyprus
Footballers from Lisbon